Lomatium salmoniflorum (salmonflower biscuitroot) is a perennial herb native to the northwest United States. In February and March one to nineteen umbels bloom, each with up to 300 flowers. Each flower is either strictly staminate or hermaphroditic. It has glabrous leaves that are deeply dissected into narrow blades.

Description
Lomatium salmoniflorum has a particularly thick taproot and the stems are often separated at the ground, 20 to 60 cm tall. Lomatium salmoniflorum is the first Lomatium species to bloom in its area. It is often confused with Lomatium grayi, the species most similar to Lomatium salmoniflorum. Lomatium salmoniflorum flowers are not as brightly yellow as other Lomatium species.

External links
USDA Plants Profile for Lomatium salmoniflorum
USDA - Lomatium salmoniflorum Photos Gallery
 FishandGame.idaho.gov: Lomatium salmoniflorum

salmoniflorum
Flora of Oregon
Flora of Washington (state)
Flora of Idaho
Endemic flora of the United States
Taxa named by John Merle Coulter
Taxa named by Lincoln Constance
Taxa named by Mildred Esther Mathias
Flora without expected TNC conservation status